India Today (formerly Headlines Today) is a 24-hour English language television network based in Noida, Uttar Pradesh that carries news, current affairs and business programming in India. The channel is owned by TV Today Network Ltd, which is a part of Living Media.

History 
The channel was launched in 2003 as a sister channel of the Hindi Aaj Tak news channel. It is one of the four  news channels from the TV Today Network stable, the others being Aaj Tak, Tez and Delhi Aaj Tak. Alok Verma was brought in as the Executive Producer to successfully launch TV Today group's foray into the English news channel category. Media watchers flagged the channel for unethical use of footage in September 2015 and sexist content.

In October 2020, India Today named in FIR filed by Mumbai police in Fake TRP Ratings Scandal. India Today was fined Rupees 5 Lakh, for Viewership Manipulation, by BARC. India Today admitted to being fined for viewership malpractice. Bombay High Court directs TV Today Network to Pay 5 lakh fine imposed by BARC

Associated journalists

 Rahul Kanwal - Executive Director
 Rajdeep Sardesai - Consulting Editor
 Gaurav C Sawant - Executive Editor
 Shiv Aroor - Consulting Editor

Anchors include Preeti Choudhry, Shiv Aroor, Gaurav Sawant, Chaiti Narula , Nabila Jamal, Akshita Nandagopal

Awards
India Today and its brother channel Aaj Tak has won numerous awards over the years at the Indian Television Academy (ITA) Awards, and the Exchange4media News Broadcasting (ENBA) Awards.

See also
 India Today

References

External links
 

Television channels and stations established in 2003
24-hour television news channels in India
India Today Group
English-language television stations in India
Mass media in Delhi 
Mass media in Uttar Pradesh 
Television stations in New Delhi 
Television channels based in Noida
Television stations in Uttar Pradesh

hi:इण्डिया टुडे (टीवी चैनल)